The Lichtspiel / Kinemathek Bern is a film archive in Bern, Switzerland.

In summer 2000, cinema technician Walter A. Ritschard took care of the Lichtspiel, an old cinematographic collection, and from this a regional film archive was developed. Since 2006, the Lichtspiel has been a member of the Fédération Internationale des Archives du Film (FIAF).

History

Regional film archive 
The Lichtspiel is concerned with preserving the national film and cinema heritage, through preservation and restoration of old materials.

Filmhaus Bern 
Since 2012, the Lichtspiel is a part of the Filmhaus Bern and in this community much more a place between film production and museum. There are often a program with films from people, who work in the same house.

Program 
Since the opening of the Lichtspiel, there are shown every Sunday evening two film reels with short clips from the archive and gives the chance to take a view inside the collection of the archive. In this way the Lichtspiel has shown 40% of his collection today. Another part of the program contains retrospectives.

Archiv- und Sammlungstätigkeit 
Die Sammlungen des Lichtspiels setzen sich aus diversen Depositen von Filmemachern sowie privaten Sammlungsbeständen und zahlreichen Nachlässen unterschiedlichster Persönlichkeiten zusammen.

The Film Collection contains in this moment 15'000 film reels with regional semi-professional, education and documentary films. Further it is a special interest of the archive to collect Scopitones and animation films.

The Library contains a lot of literature to film in generally and in detail a lot of Swiss film journals. There are also a lot of stuff to the technical aspects of cinema and projection.

See also 
 List of film archives
 ACE Association of European Film Archives and Cinematheques

External links 
 Homepage of the Lichtspiel / Kinemathek Bern

Film archives in Europe
Archives in Switzerland
Organisations based in Bern
Museums in Bern
Cinema museums